Hugues Charles Robert Méray (12 November 1835, in Chalon-sur-Saône, Saône-et-Loire – 2 February 1911, in Dijon) was a French mathematician. He is noted as the first to publish an arithmetical theory of irrational numbers. His work did not have much of a role in the history of mathematics because France, at that time, was less interested in such matters than Germany.

He was an Invited Speaker of the ICM in 1900 in Paris; his contributed paper was presented by Charles-Ange Laisant.

References

1835 births
1911 deaths
People from Chalon-sur-Saône
École Normale Supérieure alumni
French historians of mathematics